This list ranks urban areas in Europe by their population according to two different sources. The list includes urban areas that have a population of over 1 million.

Figures in the first and second column come from the UN's World Urbanization Prospects and list only urban agglomerations. Figures in the third column come from the City Population website and list all continuous urban areas, including conurbations. Further information on how the areas are defined can be found in the source documents. These figures should be seen as an interpretation, not as conclusive fact.

Urban areas

See also
List of cities in Europe by population within city limits
List of metropolitan areas in Europe
List of largest cities in the European Union by population within city limits
List of urban areas in the European Union
 List of larger urban zones (metropolitan area)
 List of cities in Europe by country
 List of European cities proper by population density
 List of European city regions
 World's largest cities

Notes and references

External links
 Largest Cities (25,000+) of Europe by number of headquarters

Urban areas
Urban areas
Europe, urban areas